In mathematics, a finite field or Galois field (so-named in honor of Évariste Galois) is a field that contains a finite number of elements.  As with any field, a finite field is a set on which the operations of multiplication, addition, subtraction and division are defined and satisfy certain basic rules.  The most common examples of finite fields are given by the integers mod  when  is a prime number.

The order of a finite field is its number of elements, which is either a prime number or a prime power. For every prime number  and every positive integer  there are fields of order  all of which are isomorphic.

Finite fields are fundamental in a number of areas of mathematics and computer science, including number theory, algebraic geometry, Galois theory, finite geometry, cryptography and coding theory.

Properties 

A finite field is a finite set which is a field; this means that multiplication, addition, subtraction and division (excluding division by zero) are defined and satisfy the rules of arithmetic known as the field axioms.

The number of elements of a finite field is called its order or, sometimes, its size.

Moreover, a field cannot contain two different finite subfields with the same order.

In a finite field of order , the polynomial  has all  elements of the finite field as roots. The non-zero elements of a finite field form a multiplicative group. This group is cyclic, so all non-zero elements can be expressed as powers of a single element called a primitive element of the field.  (In general there will be several primitive elements for a given field.)

The elements of the prime field of order  may be represented by integers in the range . The multiplicative inverse of an element may be computed by using the extended Euclidean algorithm (see ).

Let  be a finite field. The least positive  such that  is the characteristic  of the field. This multiplication makes  into a -vector space.

The identity

(sometimes called the freshman's dream) is true in a field of characteristic .

This implies the equality

More generally, every element in  satisfies the polynomial equation .

Any finite field extension of a finite field is separable and simple. To use a jargon, finite fields are perfect.

A more general algebraic structure that satisfies all the other axioms of a field, but whose multiplication is not required to be commutative, is called a division ring (or sometimes skew field). By Wedderburn's little theorem, any finite division ring is commutative, and hence is a finite field.

Existence and uniqueness
Let  be a prime power, and  be the splitting field of the polynomial 

over the prime field .

The uniqueness up to isomorphism of splitting fields implies thus that all fields of order  are isomorphic.

In summary, we have the following classification theorem first proved in 1893 by E. H. Moore:

The order of a finite field is a prime power. For every prime power  there are fields of order , and they are all isomorphic. In these fields, every element satisfies

and the polynomial  factors as 

Explicit construction

Non-prime fields
Then the quotient ring 

The multiplicative inverse of a non-zero element may be computed with the extended Euclidean algorithm; see .

However, with this representation, elements of  may be difficult to distinguish from the corresponding polynomials. Therefore, it is common to give a name, commonly  to the element of  that corresponds to the polynomial .

To simplify the Euclidean division, one commonly chooses for  a polynomial of the form 

which make the needed Euclidean divisions very efficient. However, for some fields, typically in characteristic , irreducible polynomials of the form  may not exist. In characteristic , if the polynomial  is reducible, it is recommended to choose  with the lowest possible  that makes the polynomial irreducible.

A possible choice for such a polynomial is given by Conway polynomials. They ensure a certain compatibility between the representation of a field and the representations of its subfields.

In the next sections, we will show how the general construction method outlined above works for small finite fields.

Field with four elements
See below for the complete operation tables.

This may be deduced as follows from the results of the preceding section.

Over , there is only one irreducible polynomial of degree :

Therefore, for  the construction of the preceding section must involve this polynomial, and

This implies that

The tables of the operations in  result from this, and are as follows:

A table for subtraction is not given, because subtraction is identical to addition, as is the case for every field of characteristic 2.
(Because  for every  in every ring the division by 0 has to remain undefined.)

The map

is the non-trivial field automorphism, called Frobenius automorphism, which sends  into the second root  of the above mentioned irreducible polynomial

GF(p2) for an odd prime p
For , this has been done in the preceding section.

More precisely, the polynomial  is irreducible over  if and only if  is a quadratic non-residue modulo  (this is almost the definition of a quadratic non-residue). There are  quadratic non-residues modulo .

GF(8) and GF(27)
The polynomial

GF(16)
The polynomial

It follows that the elements of  may be represented by expressions

(that is,  is defined as a root of the given irreducible polynomial).

Multiplicative structure 

The structure theorem of finite abelian groups implies that this multiplicative group is cyclic, that is, all non-zero elements are powers of a single element. In summary:

Such an element  is called a primitive element. Unless , the primitive element is not unique. The number of primitive elements is  where  is Euler's totient function.

The particular case where  is prime is Fermat's little theorem.

Discrete logarithm 

While  can be computed very quickly, for example using exponentiation by squaring, there is no known efficient algorithm for computing the inverse operation, the discrete logarithm. This has been used in various cryptographic protocols, see Discrete logarithm for details.

The identity 

Zech's logarithms are useful for large computations, such as linear algebra over medium-sized fields, that is, fields that are sufficiently large for making natural algorithms inefficient, but not too large, as one has to pre-compute a table of the same size as the order of the field.

Roots of unity

If  is a positive integer, an -th primitive root of unity is a solution of the equation  that is not a solution of the equation  for any positive integer .

In a field of characteristic , every th root of unity is also a th root of unity. It follows that primitive th roots of unity never exist in a field of characteristic .

It follows that the th cyclotomic polynomial factors over  into distinct irreducible polynomials that have all the same degree, say , and that  is the smallest field of characteristic  that contains the th primitive roots of unity.

Example: GF(64)
The field  has several interesting properties that smaller fields do not share: it has two subfields such that neither is contained in the other; not all generators (elements with minimal polynomial of degree  over ) are primitive elements; and the primitive elements are not all conjugate under the Galois group.

The remaining  elements of  generate  in the sense that no other subfield contains any of them.

Euler's totient function shows that there are  primitive th roots of unity,  primitive st roots of unity, and  primitive rd roots of unity. Summing these numbers, one finds again  elements.

 The twelve primitive st roots of unity are roots of  They form two orbits under the action of the Galois group. As the two factors are reciprocal to each other, a root and its (multiplicative) inverse do not belong to the same orbit.

In fact, this generator is a primitive element, and this polynomial is the irreducible polynomial that produces the easiest Euclidean division.

Frobenius automorphism and Galois theory 

In , the identity  implies that the map

It is called the Frobenius automorphism, after Ferdinand Georg Frobenius.

It has been shown in the preceding section that  is the identity. For , the automorphism  is not the identity, as, otherwise, the polynomial 

would have more than  roots.

In other words,  has exactly  -automorphisms, which are 

The fact that the Frobenius map is surjective implies that every finite field is perfect.

Polynomial factorization

As every polynomial ring over a field is a unique factorization domain, every monic polynomial over a finite field may be factored in a unique way (up to the order of the factors) into a product of irreducible monic polynomials.

There are efficient algorithms for testing polynomial irreducibility and factoring polynomials over finite field. They are a key step for factoring polynomials over the integers or the rational numbers. At least for this reason, every computer algebra system has functions for factoring polynomials over finite fields, or, at least, over finite prime fields.

Irreducible polynomials of a given degree
The polynomial
 
factors into linear factors over a field of order . More precisely, this polynomial is the product of all monic polynomials of degree one over a field of order .

As  does not have any multiple factor, it is thus the product of all the irreducible monic polynomials that divide it.

Number of monic irreducible polynomials of a given degree over a finite field

The number  of monic irreducible polynomials of degree  over 
 is given by

where  is the Möbius function.

The exact formula implies the inequality

this is sharp if and only if  is a power of some prime.

Applications 
In cryptography, the difficulty of the discrete logarithm problem in finite fields or in elliptic curves is the basis of several widely used protocols, such as the Diffie–Hellman protocol. For example, in 2014, a secure internet connection to Wikipedia involved the elliptic curve Diffie–Hellman protocol (ECDHE) over a large finite field. In coding theory, many codes are constructed as subspaces of vector spaces over finite fields.

Finite fields are used by many error correction codes, such as Reed–Solomon error correction code or BCH code. The finite field almost always has characteristic of 2, since computer data is stored in binary. Some CPUs have special instructions that can be useful for finite fields of characteristic 2, generally variations of carry-less product. 

Finite fields are widely used in number theory, as many problems over the integers may be solved by reducing them modulo one or several prime numbers. For example, the fastest known algorithms for polynomial factorization and linear algebra over the field of rational numbers proceed by reduction modulo one or several primes, and then reconstruction of the solution by using Chinese remainder theorem, Hensel lifting or the LLL algorithm.

Similarly many theoretical problems in number theory can be solved by considering their reductions modulo some or all prime numbers. See, for example, Hasse principle. Many recent developments of algebraic geometry were motivated by the need to enlarge the power of these modular methods. Wiles' proof of Fermat's Last Theorem is an example of a deep result involving many mathematical tools, including finite fields.

The Weil conjectures concern the number of points on algebraic varieties over finite fields and the theory has many applications including exponential and character sum estimates.

Finite fields have widespread application in combinatorics, two well known examples being the definition of Paley Graphs and the related construction for Hadamard Matrices. In arithmetic combinatorics finite fields and finite field models are used extensively, such as in Szemerédi's theorem on arithmetic progressions.

Extensions

Algebraic closure
A finite field  is not algebraically closed: the polynomial

Like any infinite Galois group,  may be equipped with the Krull topology, and then the isomorphisms just given are isomorphisms of topological groups.

Quasi-algebraic closure 
Although finite fields are not algebraically closed, they are quasi-algebraically closed, which means that every homogeneous polynomial over a finite field has a non-trivial zero whose components are in the field if the number of its variables is more than its degree. This was a conjecture of Artin and Dickson proved by Chevalley (see Chevalley–Warning theorem).

Wedderburn's little theorem
A division ring is a generalization of field. Division rings are not assumed to be commutative. There are no non-commutative finite division rings: Wedderburn's little theorem states that all finite division rings are commutative, and hence are finite fields. This result holds even if we relax the associativity axiom to alternativity, that is, all finite alternative division rings are finite fields, by the Artin–Zorn theorem.

See also 
 Quasi-finite field
 Field with one element
 Finite field arithmetic
 Finite ring
 Finite group
 Elementary abelian group
 Hamming space

Notes

References 

 W. H. Bussey (1905) "Galois field tables for pn ≤ 169", Bulletin of the American Mathematical Society 12(1): 22–38,  
 W. H. Bussey (1910) "Tables of Galois fields of order < 1000", Bulletin of the American Mathematical Society 16(4): 188–206,

External links 
 Finite Fields at Wolfram research.